This was the first edition of the Tel Aviv Open.

Tom Okker won the tournament, beating Per Hjertquist in the final, 6–4, 6–3.

Seeds

  Ilie Năstase (second round)
  Tom Okker (champion)
  David Schneider (quarterfinals)
  Raymond Moore (second round)
  Mike Cahill (second round)
  Michael Grant (second round)
 N/A
  Per Hjertquist (final)

Draw

Finals

Top half

Bottom half

References

 Main Draw

Tel Aviv Open
1979 Grand Prix (tennis)